is a railway station in Kyōtanabe, Kyoto, Kyoto, Japan. There is a transfer to the nearby Shin-Tanabe Station on the Kintetsu Kyoto Line.

Lines
West Japan Railway Company (JR West)
Katamachi Line (Gakkentoshi Line)

Stations next to Kyōtanabe

History 
Station numbering was introduced in March 2018 with Kyōtanabe being assigned station number JR-H24.

Surrounding area
Shin-Tanabe Station
It takes about 7 minutes from here on foot.
Ikkyūji Temple
The temple associated with Ikkyū.

References

External links

Railway stations in Kyoto Prefecture
Railway stations in Japan opened in 1898